The Russian Anarchists is a history book by Paul Avrich about the Russian anarchist movement from the 19th century to the Bolshevik revolution.

References

External links 

 
 

1967 non-fiction books
American history books
Anarchism in Russia
Books by Paul Avrich
English-language books
History books about anarchism
History books about Russia
Princeton University Press books